Samira Ghastin Karimona (born 25 December 1935), better known by her stage name Samira Tewfik (surname also spelled Tawfik, Tawfiq, Toufiq or Taoufiq) is a Lebanese singer who gained fame in the Arab world for her specializing in singing in the Bedouin dialect of Jordan.

Biography 
Samira was born into an Armenian Christian family in the village of Umm Haratayn in the Suwayda region of Syria. She lived in the Rmeil neighborhood of Beirut, Lebanon, where her father, Ghastin, worked as a dock laborer. As a child, she enjoyed Classical Arab music and was particularly a fan of Farid al-Atrash. She often climbed a tree at her home and sang his songs aloud. She was heard by musician Albert Ghaoui, who was impressed with her voice and asked her father to become her musical mentor. Ghaoui introduced Samira to the Egyptian musician Tawfiq Bayoumi who taught her the tawashih musical form. Bayoumi also gave her the stage name "Tawfiq" (or "Tewfik") ("Success") when he told her al-Tawfiq Min Allah (success will come with the blessing of God). Her first hit on Radio Beirut was a song originally sung by Bayoumi called Maskin Ya Qalbi Yama Tlaawat ("Oh My Heart How You Have Suffered").

She struggled for success in Lebanon, due to the highly popular competing acts of Fairuz, Sabah and Wadi al-Safi, but she excelled after basing herself in Jordan in the 1960s and 1970s. There, the Jordanian Broadcasting Authority (JBA) employed her with the request that she sing in the Bedouin dialect. The JBA trained her to sing in the local dialect to make her music genuinely sound Transjordanian. Her first song played by Jordanian radio was her first hit, Maskin Ya Qalbi Yama Tlaawat. Samira performed her first concert at a Jordanian village called Ainata and the following day was invited to perform at an event attended by King Hussein. King Hussein became a fan of her Bedouin tunes and mawawil. She became the representative of Jordanian music to the Arab world by singing with the rustic, Bedouin dialect.

Samira would often perform in flamboyant, Bedouin-style dress, which gave her a "Bedouin aura" according to Joseph Massad, although the type of dress she wore did not resemble actual Bedouin clothing. She became famous in Jordan for the nationalist-inspired songs Diritna al-Urduniya ("Our Jordanian Tribal Land") and Urdunn al-Quffiya al-Hamra ("Jordan of the Red Kuffiyah"), both songs that sought marry the concepts of the traditional nomadic culture and a Jordanian sense of nationhood. Her most commercially successful love song was Al Eyn Mulayitain ("Two Trips to the Water Spring"), which was about a rural girl who crosses a bridge multiple times a day ostensibly to collect water for her family, but with the actual intent of meeting a young man she is in love with.

Samira is generally considered the first major artist to represent Jordanian music and make it popular in the Arab world, and her Bedouin style inspired other artists to follow suit in Jordan. Nonetheless, Samira's popularity was not matched by other Jordanian singers until the early 1990s with the singer Umar al-Abdallat.
 
Samira currently lives in Hazmiyeh, a town and suburb of Beirut. The Hazmiyeh Municipality threw her an honorary celebration on 20 July 2015.

References

Bibliography

 
 

1935 births
Lebanese people of Armenian descent
Syrian people of Armenian descent
Lebanese Christians
Syrian Christians
Lebanese women singers
Syrian women singers
Lebanese film actresses
Living people
Actresses from Beirut
People from as-Suwayda Governorate
Musicians from Beirut